Fake Shark (formerly known as Fake Shark – Real Zombie!) is a Canadian electronic indie-pop band from Vancouver, British Columbia. Formed in 2005, their early musical style mainly combined elements of dance punk and IDM but have since shifted to a more commercial pop sound. The name is a reference to Lucio Fulci's film Zombi 2, where a real shark and a zombie engage in combat.

History
Fake Shark was conceived by Kevin "Kevvy Mental" Maher and Louis Wu in October 2005 as a way of combining the styles of the bands they liked in hopes to one day open for them. They met in high school and formed Fake Shark shortly after graduation. To complete the band, they recruited (via Craigslist) bassist Dan Hughes and The Heck's former drummer, Malcolm Holt. In 2007, Hughes left the band and was replaced by The Heck's and Hot Hot Heat's former bassist, Parker Bossley. The onslaught of MySpace buzz garnered the interest of Vinyl Junkie Records in Japan who released the band's debut album Zebra! Zebra! on April 25, 2007.

While life-sized cut-outs of the band's members at HMV stores in Japan may indicate a popularity outside the arena of punk, the band still adheres to the punk lifestyle. It has been said that bouncers have had to "manually take down microphones and disassemble gear for the band to stop playing."
Henry Rollins has stated that they are one of his favorite new bands and has played them several times on his radio show, Harmony in My Head.

Fake Shark have toured with artists such as Mindless Self Indulgence, Klaxons, Hot Hot Heat, Brokencyde, The Birthday Massacre, Marianas Trench (band), Jeffree Star and Test Icicles. They have also completed three tours of the United Kingdom and performed four sold out dates in Japan. 2008 saw Fake Shark with a North American release of Zebra! Zebra! on March 11, 2008 and the release their new EP Style of Substance followed by additional tours of North America and the UK and festival appearances in Japan.

During summer 2008, the band went into the studio with music producer Dave "Rave" Ogilvie (known for his work with Skinny Puppy, Jakalope, Marilyn Manson and Nine Inch Nails) to record their second album. The result was Meeting People Is Terrible, a sophomore attempt that seems just as eclectic as their first but with even more genres covered and mashed such as funk and industrial. The band had leaked two tracks ("Jewellery" and "Angel Lust") from the album and a bonus single, a cover of Portishead's "Sour Times", on their MySpace page. They released the album, August 26, 2009 in Japan and May 31, 2010 worldwide.

In 2009, Kevvy Mental scored the short film starring Canadian singer Sarah Slean entitled Last Flowers directed by CJ Wallis. The film was nominated for a pair of Leo Awards.

Fake Shark Real Zombie's 2013 album is called Liar. Producers and collaborators include Steve Bays, Greig Nori, Dave Ogilvie, Jimmy Urine, members of Die Mannequin, Japanese Voyeurs, and The Birthday Massacre.

In 2015, the band released three new singles, "Can't See You" (featuring Renholder) for the Soska Twins' 2014 horror film See No Evil 2, "Zodiac" for Vendetta starring Dean Cain and Big Show, and "Cheap Thrills", the first single under the band's rebranded name "Fake Shark".

On 13 May. 2016, Fake Shark released the second single, "Something Special" off their upcoming album.

On March 20. 2017, the band announced their new album Faux Real and released the album's 3rd single, "Heart 2 Heart".  Faux Real was released 26 May. 2017 via Light Organ Records.

In 2021, the band was reported to be appearing on the podcast Storybound.

Discography
Albums
 Zebra! Zebra! (2007)
 Meeting People Is Terrible (2009)
 Liar (2013)
 Faux Real (2017)
 Walking Through A Fantasy (2018)
 ‘’Time For The Future’’ (2021)

Compilations
 Quadruple Dare: Vancouver Mutilation
 Don't Forget

References

Dance-punk musical groups
Musical groups established in 2005
Musical groups from Vancouver
Canadian post-hardcore musical groups
2005 establishments in British Columbia